Gorbeh Kucheh (also Romanized as Gorbeh Kūcheh; also known as Gorbeh Kūjeh) is a village in Rud Pish Rural District, in the Central District of Fuman County, Gilan Province, Iran. At the 2006 census, its population was 105, in 25 families.

References 

Populated places in Fuman County